Richard Pryor: Here and Now is a 1983 American stand-up comedy concert film starring, written and directed by Richard Pryor. The film was released in the United States on October 28, 1983.

Soundtrack

The soundtrack album was released by Warner Bros. Records. Recorded at Saenger Theatre in New Orleans, Louisiana, it was released alongside the film.

Track listing
"Here and Now" - 3:19
"Southern Hospitality" - 1:38
"Slavery" - 1:15
"Motherland" - 6:38
"I Met the President" - 4:15
"Fire Exit" - 0:46
"Mudbone (Part One)" - 6:24
"Mudbone (Part Two)" - 4:40
"Inebriated" - 5:54
"One Night Stands" - 2:54
"One Day at a Time" - 4:57
"I Like Women" - 6:22
"Being Famous" - 2:01
"I Remember" - 1:36
"Interview" (Boxset Bonus Track) - 22:43

References

External links 
 
 
 

1983 films
1983 comedy films
1980s English-language films
African-American films
African-American comedy films
American comedy films
Columbia Pictures films
Films directed by Richard Pryor
Films with screenplays by Richard Pryor
Richard Pryor
Stand-up comedy concert films
1980s American films